The black scorpionfish (Scorpaena porcus), also known as the European scorpionfish or small-scaled scorpionfish, is a venomous scorpionfish, common in marine subtropical waters. It is widespread in the Eastern Atlantic Ocean from the British Isles to the Azores and Canary Islands, near the coasts of Morocco, in the Mediterranean Sea and the Black Sea.

Taxonomy
The black scorpionfish was first formally described in 1758 by Carl Linnaeus in the 10th edition of his Systema Naturae in which he gave the type localities as the Mediterranean Sea and the Atlantic Ocean. Linnaeus also described the genus Scorpaena and in 1876 the Dutch ichthyologist Pieter Bleeker designated S. porcus as the type species of the genus Scorpaena. The specific name porcus means "pig", an allusion which Linnaeus did not explain. However, it may reference the belief, originating with Athenaeus who said that he observed this species eating algae or weed and this was mistranslated in the Renaissance as "mud".

Description
The head is broad with a short snout and upwardly angled mouth. There is a short tentacle just above the eye and various other shorter tentacles, spines and flaps of skin decorating the head. The dorsal fin has twelve spines and nine soft rays and the anal fin has two spines and six soft rays. The pectoral fins are large and oval and have sixteen to eighteen rays. The colour of this fish is generally brownish and there is a dark pigmented spot between the eighth and ninth dorsal spines. The fins are mottled with brown and the caudal fin has three vertical brown stripes.

Distribution and habitat
The black scorpionfish is native to the eastern Atlantic Ocean, the Mediterranean Sea and the Black Sea. Its range extends southwards from the southern half of the British Isles to the Azores, the Canary Islands and the northwestern coast of Africa.

Biology
The black scorpionfish is a benthic species and is usually found resting among seaweed and on rocks. It is usually solitary, and it feeds on small fishes such as blennies and gobies, crustaceans and other bottom-dwelling invertebrates. Little is known about its reproduction.  This is one of the fish used by the marine leech Pontobdella muricata as a host.

References

External links
 

Scorpaena
Fish described in 1758
Fish of the Mediterranean Sea
Fish of the Black Sea
Fish of Europe
Taxa named by Carl Linnaeus